12th Anniversary Show may refer to:

EMLL 12th Anniversary Show
ROH 12th Anniversary Show